Ambrosia psilostachya is a species of ragweed known by the common names Cuman ragweed and perennial ragweed, and western ragweed.

Distribution and habitat
The plant is widespread across much of North America (United States, Canada, and northern Mexico). It is also naturalized in parts of Europe, Asia, Australia, and South America. It is a common plant in many habitat types, including disturbed areas such as roadsides.

Description
Ambrosia psilostachya is an erect perennial herb growing a slender, branching, straw-colored stem to a maximum height near two meters, but more often remaining under one meter tall. Leaves are up to 12 centimeters long and vary in shape from lance-shaped to nearly oval, and they are divided into many narrow, pointed lobes. The stem and leaves are hairy.

The top of the stem is occupied by an inflorescence which is usually a spike. The species is monoecious, and the inflorescence is composed of staminate (male) flower heads with the pistillate heads located below and in the axils of leaves. This bloom period is from June through November.

The pistillate heads yield fruits which are achenes located within oval-shaped greenish-brown burs about half a centimeter long. The burs are hairy and sometimes spiny. The plant reproduces by seed and by sprouting up from a creeping rhizome-like root system.

Ecology
Ambrosia psilostachya is a host plant for the caterpillars of Bucculatrix transversata, Cosmopterix opulenta, Exaeretia gracilis, Gnorimoschema saphirinella, Schinia sexplagiata; the beetles Zygogramma disrupta, Zygogramma suturalis; and the grasshopper Spharagemon collare.

Medicinal uses
This plant had a number of medicinal uses among several different Native American tribes, including the Cheyenne, Kumeyaay (Diegueno), and  Kiowa people.

Chemistry
Ambrosia psilostachya contains a group of phytochemicals called psilostachyins.

References

External links
Calflora Database: Ambrosia psilostachya (Western ragweed)
Jepson Manual eFlora (TJM2) treatment: Ambrosia psilostachya
USDA National Forest Service, FEIS Ecology of Ambrosia psilostachya
USGS.gov: Northern Prairie Wildlife Profile
UC Calphotos Photos gallery of Ambrosia psilostachya

psilostachya
Flora of Canada
Flora of Northeastern Mexico
Flora of Northwestern Mexico
Flora of the Eastern United States
Flora of the Western United States
Plants described in 1836
Taxa named by Augustin Pyramus de Candolle
Natural history of the California chaparral and woodlands
Plants used in traditional Native American medicine
Flora without expected TNC conservation status